Frederick J. Heckwolf (January 7, 1879 – March 21, 1924) was an American track and field athlete, a member of the Missouri Athletic Club, St Louis, who competed in the 1904 Summer Olympics.

In 1904 he was fifth in the 100 m sprint competition where he recorded a time of 11.6 seconds.

References

External links
list of American athletes 

1879 births
1924 deaths
American male sprinters
Olympic track and field athletes of the United States
Athletes (track and field) at the 1904 Summer Olympics